Gordon Smart (born 31 March 1980 in Edinburgh and raised in Kinross) is a Scottish broadcaster and former journalist and editor of The Scottish Sun.

Journalism career
Smart's career in journalism started at DC Thomson in Dundee where he was employed as a junior reporter on the Evening Telegraph and Dundee Courier in June 1998. He studied journalism at Napier University in Edinburgh.

Unable to find work in newspapers Smart worked as a football coach for Dutch company Coerver between 2001–02. After two football injuries he returned to Scotland to work for Deadline Press and Picture Agency, covering news in the east of Scotland. When the MTV Europe Music Awards were held in Edinburgh in 2003, Smart was introduced to Victoria Newton, then editor of the Bizarre showbiz column of The Sun newspaper who gave him shifts for the Sun in London, leading to a three month contract with the News of the World.

Smart joined Bizarre at The Sun in 2004 as Victoria Newton's deputy; then became column editor when she was promoted to head of entertainment in November 200. His column comprised a 'cabinet' of Pete Samson ("Office of the minister of music"), Danielle Lawler and other deputies. Lawler left to join The Daily Mirror as a 3am Girl soon after, while Samson now holds the US Editor position at The Sun.

In 2013, he was one of the witnesses to the helicopter crash at the "Clutha" Pub in Glasgow, which killed 10 people.

Smart became a deputy editor of the Sun in London in May 2016 but left the paper altogether in November 2016 to focus on other business and broadcasting interests.

Radio
Smart hosted a show on Global Radio's XFM between 2011 and 2013, returning to the station, rebranded Radio X, in April 2016 to host a Sunday show.  In January 2017 he became the host of the weekday evening show .

In March 2020, Smart he left Radio X due to ill health and in September 2020, it was confirmed that Smart would not be returning.

Other media work
Smart once appeared on The Xtra Factor as a part of the celebrity panel. In May 2010 he appeared on Channel 4's Real Stories discussing the careers of music stars including Cheryl, Rihanna and Simon Cowell with host Dave Berry.

He now works for TalkSPORT on the 4pm to 7pm Drivetime show

Gordon started on Good Morning Britain in December 2022 as a cover presenter.

As of August 2022, Gordon hosts the Restless Natives weekly podcast via Global Player alongside friend, actor and fellow Scot, Martin Compston.

References

Living people
1980 births
Scottish people